Goal of the Decade may refer to:

Premier League Goal of the Decade, an association football award from the British Premier League
Sportschau Goal of the Decade, an association football award from the German TV channel Sportschau

See also

Goal of the century
Goal of the Year (disambiguation)
Goal of the Season (disambiguation)
Goal of the Month (disambiguation)